Harold Herd may refer to:

 Harold Herd (rugby union) (1910–c. 1962), rugby union player who represented Australia
 Harold S. Herd (1918–2007), American politician and jurist